Turag River is the upper tributary of the Buriganga, a major river in Bangladesh. The Turag originates from the Bangshi River, the latter an important tributary of the Dhaleshwari River, flows through Gazipur and joins the Buriganga at Mirpur in Dhaka District. It is navigable by boat all year round.

Turag suffers from infilling along its banks, which restricts its flow. It also suffers from acute water pollution. While attempts have been made to marginally widen the river, the majority of industry has made little effort to follow environmental law and the water has become visibly discolored.

History

Earlier this river was called as (Bengali: "Kohor Doriya"), "Kohor river".

Religious significance

Tabligh Jam'at, a popular Islamic movement originating in South Asia, initially took hold in Dhaka in the 1950s as Maulana Abdul Aziz and other leaders set up the regional headquarters at the Kakrail Mosque near Ramna Park. An initiative of the movement is an emphasis on the six uṣūl or "basic principles," two of which include ilm, the pursuit of knowledge, and dhikr or zikr, a method of prayer involving repetitive invocation of hadith and Qur'an passages. To this end, the movement places importance on ijtema or assembly, where members gather to practice and participate in dhikr, hear religious sermons and discuss their activities.

The largest of these, the Bishwa Ijtema, is situated by the Turag River in Tongi and attracts estimates of between two and four million Muslims annually as well as representatives from over sixty countries, making it the second biggest Islamic congregation after the Hajj.

References

External links
 

Rivers of Bangladesh
Sacred rivers
Rivers of Dhaka Division